Asparuh Panov is a Bulgarian physician and liberal politician. He is a former Member of Parliament and former Vice President of the Liberal International.

He was Project Coordinator of the Friedrich Naumann Foundation for Bulgaria and Macedonia until 2013. Panov belongs to the liberal wing of the Union of Democratic Forces and has been leader of the Radical Democratic Party. He is a signatory of the Prague Declaration on European Conscience and Communism.

References

Bulgarian politicians
Living people
Year of birth missing (living people)
Place of birth missing (living people)